"Dynamite" is a song recorded by Canadian country music group Desert Dolphins. It was released in 1994 as their debut single. It peaked at number 10 on the RPM Country Tracks chart in October 1994.

Chart performance

Year-end charts

References

1994 songs
1994 debut singles
Desert Dolphins songs